Carlton is a part rural, part residential locality in the local government area of Sorell in the Hobart region of Tasmania. The 2016 census determined a population of 1119 for the state suburb of Carlton.

History
Carlton was gazetted as a locality in 1967.

Geography
The shore of Frederick Henry Bay, known as Carlton Beach, is the southern boundary.

Road infrastructure
The C334 route (Carlton River Road) enters from the west and runs through to the east, where it exits.

References

Localities of Sorell Council
Towns in Tasmania